The Universities Space Research Association (USRA) was incorporated on March 12, 1969, in Washington, D.C. as a private, nonprofit corporation under the auspices of the National Academy of Sciences (NAS). 
Institutional membership in the association currently stands at 113 universities. All member institutions have graduate programs in space sciences or technology. Besides the 98 member institutions in the United States, there are two member institutions in Canada, four in Europe, two in Israel, one in Australia and one in New Zealand, one in Hong Kong, two in Korea  and two in the United Kingdom.

Objective
USRA provides a mechanism through which universities can cooperate effectively with one another, with the government, and with other organizations to further space science and technology, and to promote education in these areas. Its mission is carried out through the institutes, centers, divisions, and programs. Administrative and scientific personnel now number about 420. A unique feature of USRA's management is its system of standing panels of technical experts, drawn from the research community, to provide oversight for USRA's institutes, centers, divisions and programs.

Origin

USRA was founded in 1969, at NASA's request, under the auspices of the National Academy of Sciences.  Just prior to the Apollo 11 Moon landing, and the return of the lunar samples, NASA sought a new partner organization to engage and organize the research community. James Webb, NASA Administrator, wrote to President Frederick Seitz, proposing a university association, chartered to advance space science and technology.  The result: the formation of USRA.
Webb envisioned this new association as not only working with NASA in lunar science, but also in other scientific disciplines and technology areas, in which NASA would become engaged, as its space exploration role unfolded.

As the civilian space program grew to encompass missions in heliophysics, planetary science, astrophysics, Earth science, microgravity science, and other disciplines, as well as technology development, USRA worked alongside NASA. All the efforts under taken by USRA from its founding to the present day fulfil its non-profit purpose  and also realize Webb's vision of close partnership and engagement of universities.

USRA's first task: operation of the Lunar Science Institute and engaging the scientific community in the analysis of lunar samples that would be returned to Earth during the Apollo missions.  Now called the Lunar and Planetary Institute, the LPI cultivated strong collaboration between NASA and the international research community to help organize a new research discipline: lunar and planetary science.  The LPI helped lead research that resulted in a new understanding about the origin of the Moon.  Today, the LPI, located in USRA's facility near NASA's Johnson Space Center, continues the important job of organizing community activities to support NASA's exploration of our solar system, with a specialized scientific and administrative staff.

Charter
On March 1, 1968, President Lyndon Johnson announced the creation of the Lunar Science Institute (LSI), and USRA was chartered the following year as the parent organization of LSI. The initial headquarters of USRA was at the University of Virginia, where Professor A. R. Kuhlthau served as the first president of the association.

In 1976, Dr. Alexander J. Dessler became the second USRA president. Dessler moved the headquarters of the association to Rice University, where he served as chairman of the Department of Space Physics and Astronomy.

In 1978 USRA headquarters moved to Columbia, Maryland.

Dr. David C. Black was appointed USRA president in 2000. Black served as director of USRA's Lunar and Planetary Institute from 1988 to 2001, and is internationally recognized for research in theoretical astrophysics and planetary science.

Dr. Jeffrey Isaacson was named president and CEO of USRA, effective October 20, 2014.

Other programs
USRA initially concentrated on the management of Lunar Science Institute (later renamed the Lunar and Planetary Institute) but, armed with its broad charter, the consortium began to explore other ways to serve the university space research community as early as 1970. Today, USRA researchers are involved with university, government and industry scientists and engineers in a broad array of space and aeronautics related fields, including astronomy and astrophysics, earth sciences, microgravity, life sciences, space technology, computer science, and advanced concepts.

Most USRA research activities include related educational components.

The presidents of USRA have been:
 A. Robert Kuhlthau (1969–1976)
 Alexander J. Dessler (1976–1981)
 Paul J. Coleman Jr. (1981–2000)
 David C. Black (2000–2006)
 Frederick A. Tarantino (2006–2014)
 Donald Kniffen (2014) [acting]
 Jeffrey Isaacson (2014–present)

Current Institutes and Programs

Previous Institutes and Programs

References

External links
 

Engineering university associations and consortia
Space agencies
Space organizations
United States National Academy of Sciences
Organizations established in 1969
1969 establishments in Washington, D.C.
Non-profit organizations based in Maryland